Kevin Fogg (born October 6, 1990) is a professional gridiron football defensive back and punt returner for the Montreal Alouettes of the Canadian Football League. He played college football at Liberty University.

Career
Fogg bounced around the NFL from 2014 to 2015, including a stint in the developmental Fall Experimental Football League (FXFL). He eventually signed with the Winnipeg Blue Bombers of the CFL for the 2016 season. Fogg spent three seasons in Winnipeg as a starting defensive back, accumulating 154 tackles, 10 interceptions, 6 forced fumbles, and one defensive touchdown. Fogg was also utilized as a punt returner, amassing 2259 yards and a touchdown on 200 returns. He became a free agent in February 2019.

Near the end of the first day of free agency, Fogg signed with the Toronto Argonauts, alongside fellow returner Chris Rainey. He played in seven games for the team, recording 24 defensive tackles and one interception. As a pending free agent in 2020, he was released during the free agency negotiation window on February 7, 2020.

On February 18, 2020, it was announced that Fogg had signed with the Montreal Alouettes.

Statistics

References

External links
 CFL bio

Living people
1990 births
American football defensive backs
Canadian football defensive backs
African-American players of American football
African-American players of Canadian football
Liberty Flames football players
Brooklyn Bolts players
Pittsburgh Steelers players
Winnipeg Blue Bombers players
Players of American football from Raleigh, North Carolina
Sportspeople from Raleigh, North Carolina
Miami Dolphins players
Canadian football return specialists
Toronto Argonauts players
Montreal Alouettes players